SM U-17 or U-XVII was a  or U-boat of the Austro-Hungarian Navy ( or ) during World War I. U-17 was laid down in Germany in April 1915 and shipped in sections by rail to Pola in August, where she was assembled. She was delivered to the Austro-Hungarian Navy at the end of September and commissioned in October 1915.

U-17 primarily operated from Cattaro, patrolling off the Italian and Albanian coasts. The submarine had several opportunities to sink merchant ships and warships throughout the war, only can sank one unidentified sailing vessel in January 1916 and one Italian destroyer in July 1916 as part of an effort to disrupt the Otranto Barrage. At the end of the war, U-17 was undergoing repairs at Pola. She was handed over to Italy as a war reparation and scrapped in 1920.

Design and construction 
U-17 was a small, coastal submarine that displaced  surfaced and  submerged. She featured a single shaft, a single  Daimler diesel engine for surface running, and a single  electric motor for submerged travel. She was designed for a crew of 17 officers and men.

U-17 was equipped with two  torpedo tubes located in the front and carried a complement of two torpedoes. In October 1916, U-17s armament was supplemented with a 37 mm/23 (1.5 in) quick-firing (QF) gun. This gun was replaced by a /33 QF gun in November 1917.

U-17 was ordered by the Austro-Hungarian Navy on 1 April 1915 and laid down at AG Weser in Bremen later that month. When completed, the submarine was broken down into sections, loaded onto railcars, and shipped to the Austro-Hungarian Navy's main base at Pola on 30 August. After completing the four-day journey, the sections were riveted together. Though there is no specific mention of how long it took for U-17s sections to be assembled, a sister boat, the German Type UB I submarine UB-3, shipped to Pola from Germany in mid-April 1915, was assembled in about two weeks. U-17 was delivered to the Austro-Hungarian Navy on 30 September.

Operational history 
SM U-17 was commissioned into the Austro-Hungarian Navy on 6 October under the command of Linienschiffsleutnant Franz Skopinic. The boat patrolled the Italian coast out of Pola for most of the next two months, interrupted by engine repairs in mid November. On 9 December, Skopinic was succeeded as U-17s commanding officer by Linienschiffsleutnant Zdenko Hudecek.

By the end of December, U-17 was operating from Cattaro and patrolling off the Albanian and Montenegrin coasts. Hudecek and U-17 made two unsuccessful attacks on enemy destroyers in January. On 23 February, Hudecek attempted an attack on a cargo ship off Durazzo, but was discovered and depth charged. Two days later the submarine put into Cattaro to replace a broken gyrocompass with a new magnetic compass.
In mid-March, U-17 shifted to patrol off the Italian coast once again and was attacked by air on 15 March off Brindisi. The Italian patrols continued until late May, when U-17 was sent to patrol in the Ionian Sea. Duty in the Straits of Otranto followed in June, as part of the plan to disrupt the Otranto Barrage. On 12 June, the submarine attempted an attack on an Italian ; the torpedo boat survived and repaid U-17 by dropping several depth charges nearby. On 10 July, U-17 torpedoed and sank the  Italian destroyer , The Italian ship had been guarding drifters, small fishing vessels with anti-submarine nets stretched between them as part of the Otranto Barrage. Impetuoso was the only ship sunk by U-17. The U-boat continued patrols in the Adriatic throughout the remainder of 1916. U-17 was depth charged by a destroyer off Fano on 14 September. Two days later, a failed attack on a steamer resulted in another depth charging of U-17, this time by an Orfeo-class torpedo boat. In early October, an air attack by two airplanes damaged U-17.

The year 1917 was uneventful for U-17. The submarine resumed patrols off Albania in January. In May, the U-boat had to crash dive near Valona when a bomber appeared overhead and dropped its payload. A foray to Bari in July provided another opportunity to attack a steamer, but the torpedoes missed their mark. On 16 August, U-17, by now under the command of Linienschiffsleutnant Hermann Rigele, attempted a torpedo attack on a cargo ship off Saseno. At the end of October, U-17 escaped damage from a torpedo attack by an enemy submarine near Cape Menders, Albania. A month later, the submarine was once again attacked by air, surviving two bombs dropped from a single airplane.

In the first part of June 1918, U-17 patrolled off the coast of Italy, but had returned to Cattaro on 12 June. Two weeks later, the boat set out for Pola to undergo repairs. At the end of the war, the ship's repairs remained unfinished. U-17, at Pola with six other Austro-Hungarian submarines, was ceded to Italy as a war reparation. U-17 was broken up at Pola by the Italians in 1920.

Summary of raiding history

Notes

References

Bibliography 

 

 
 
 
 
 

U-10-class submarines
Ships built in Bremen (state)
Ships built in Pola
1915 ships
World War I submarines of Austria-Hungary